The Rochester Top 100 is an annual list of the fastest growing privately held companies in the Rochester, New York region. It is published by the Rochester Business Alliance, a regional chamber of commerce whose members include area companies such as Bausch & Lomb, Constellation Brands, Eastman Kodak, Genesee Brewing Company, and Xerox. The 2011 list marked the 25th anniversary of the Rochester Top 100. 

In 2011, 10 companies in the Rochester Top 100 were owned by women, four were owned by minorities. The number of companies in the Rochester Top 100 devoted to manufacturing doubled in 2011, to 22 from just 11 in 2010.

Methodology

To be eligible for inclusion, companies must be independently owned and have at least $1 million in revenue for each of the three most recent fiscal years. They must be headquartered one of the following counties in New York State: Monroe, Ontario, Wayne, Livingston, Genesee, Orleans, Wyoming, Seneca or Yates. Rankings take into account both dollar and percentage growth over the three most recent fiscal years.

The 1975 List

References

R
R